Montenegro is one of the fastest-growing tourist destinations. In 2007, over a million tourists visited Montenegro, making some 7.3 million overnight stays (23% increase, compared to 2006). This accounted for some 480 million euros in tourism revenue in 2007 (39% increase, compared to previous year). In 2015, tourism realised over 1.7 million arrivals, with a further increase in 2016. In the same year, the coastal town of Kotor was named the best city to visit by Lonely Planet, whereas the country itself is continuously included in touristic top lists. With a total of 1.8 million visitors in 2016, the nation became the 36th (out of 47 countries) most popular country to travel to in Europe. Montenegro was further visited by over 2 million tourists in 2017. The Government aims to attract greenfield investments, which should make best use of undeveloped parts of the coast, such as Jaz Beach, Velika Plaža, Ada Bojana and Buljarica. 

Montenegro can be presented as a destination offering a variety of attractions and all-year tourism is possible by publicizing its varied features. Therefore, the Tourism Masterplan of Montenegro is also paving the way for a national development program for nature based tourism, especially hiking and biking, with new infrastructure and services. The realisation of a 3-year-program was started in 2007.

Main points of interest

Coastal region

North Coast region

This notable coastal region is of primary interest to tourists in Montenegro. The Montenegrin Adriatic coast is 295 km long, with 72 km of beaches, and with many well-preserved ancient old towns. The main attractions along the north coast are:
 The old Town of Herceg Novi
 The Savina Monastery overlooking the entrance to the Bay of Kotor
 The old town of Kotor, listed with UNESCO World Heritage Sites
 Boka Kotorska (Bay of Kotor), with the ancient small town of Perast
 Porto Montenegro – Luxury Yacht Marina in Tivat (only city on Montenegrin coast to have airport)
 The old town of Budva, a well preserved old town
 Sveti Stefan, a small island hamlet turned into a luxury hotel
 Town Petrovac near Budva

South Coast region

The South Coast region of Montenegro is considered one of the great new "discoveries" among world tourists. In January 2010, The New York Times ranked the Ulcinj South Coast region of Montenegro, including Velika Plaza, Ada Bojana, and the Hotel Mediteran of Ulcinj, as among the "Top 31 Places to Go in 2010" as part of a worldwide ranking of tourism destinations 

The South Coast region, centered in Ulcinj, is popular in part due to the "Blue Flag beach" sandy beaches, eco-adventure activities, ancient fortress-cities, and vibrant nightlife. These destinations include:
 The old town of Ulcinj with its prominent battlements and Cyclopean walls, bustling nightlife and sea-side strand, and home of the Montenegro's longest pristine beach, Velika Plaza.
 The old town of Bar, Montenegro with its "living museum" at Stari Bar.
 Ada Bojana at the very south of Montenegro's coastline, with its famed daily fresh catch featured at the area's seafood riverside restaurants.16 km from Ulcinj.
 The vast water body and wildlife reserve Skadar Lake at Ulcinj's Salt Flats, one of the largest nesting places on the European continent for migratory birds.
 The pebble beach and massive olive groves at Valdanos.
 The beach, sea caves and pine resin in the air at Ulcinj's Ladies Beach, that for generations locals have known promise cures for infertility and other ailments.
 The only deep water harbor and commercial port in Montenegro, at Bar.
 Beaches, fortresses and villages on Skadar Lake

Northern Region
The Northern Region is the centre of Montenegrin mountain tourism. It has ski resorts, and is popular for its untouched nature. The entire area of Durmitor mountain and the Tara river canyon is protected as a national park, and listed with UNESCO World Heritage Sites.

Destinations in the North:

 The town of Plav and visitor summit 2211m above sea level (mountain peak) above Plav. Magnificent panoramic view of the mountains of Albania, Serbia and Montenegro. Along side Bogićevica summit 2533m and Zla Kolata summit 2535m which is the highest Peak in Montenegro. Mosque Sultanija the last Ottoman mosque in the Balkans. Plav Lake It is the largest glacial lake in Montenegro, and is also the best-known tourist attraction in the area. The Redzepagic Tower is the oldest and most interesting housing-defence facility in the city of Plav. It was built in 1671. The tower is now hosting the local ethnographic collection with more than 2000 exhibits which reach back as far as the middle ages to the present day. Hrid lake is known by locals as Fairy Lake and lake of happiness, is at 1970m and is the highest lake of Prokletijes and Montenegro. A refreshing swim best in July and August and not reachable by vehicles. Ali-Pasha’s Springs (Ali Pasini Izvori) is one of the premium attractions in Prokletije National Park. The river is formed directly by outbreak from the soil, from the many small springs, a couple kilometers from Gusinje. There are multiple ethnic villages (Etno Selo) to enjoy the traditional food, herbal therapy and horse riding.

 The town of Pljevlja with the coat of arms of the Đurđevića Tara Bridge over the Tara (river), the largest canyon in Europe, the second-deepest canyon in the world. The canyon is known for the attraction of countless fast springs from the rocks during rafting. 
Ljubišnja triple Highland mountain chain and largest forest mountain range in Montenegro with the center in the village of Bobovo. Sandica Ubo the historic hamlet on the cliffs of the Tara river is part of the Durmitor National Park. Climbing, hiking, and photographing forested areas is a tourist practice. The habitat of wild horses is located on Horse field on Ljubisnja. Dairy products and organic food are produced by local farmers.    
 Municipium S ... Komini Pljevlja archaeological site from the Roman period found by Arthur Evans.
Heritage museum Pljevlja the most representative and richest museum in Montenegro with a unique piece of Cage cup.  
Monastery of the Holy Trinity near Pljevlja is famous as a place of pilgrimage known as a monastery for which a very famous medieval Enlightenment fraternity has guarded the bishop's scepter and a chest with holy bridges of one hand of Saint Sava for centuries which were moved to Church of Saint Sava.
Husein-paša's Mosque in Pljevlja with the famous blue artistic arabesque on the ceiling of the tallest dome of the mosque and with the tallest minaret (42m) in the Balkans.
Monumental memorial complex dedicated to the partisan fighters killed during the Battle of Pljevlja, the tallest monument to the anti-fascist movement in the Socialist Federal Republic of Yugoslavia.
Memorial monument dedicated to the founding of Brigate Garibaldi formed in the valley of the village Mrzovici near Pljevlja opened with a ceremony with respect by the Italian president Sandro Pertini.   

 The town of Žabljak on the Durmitor mountain, the most popular mountain tourism destination in Montenegro
 The town of Kolašin, another tourist destination, near the Biogradska Gora national park, the Bjelasica mountain and the ski-resort Bjelasica

 Biogradska Gora, with Biogradsko Lake, a national park and untouched virgin forest.

Central region
Although it is the most densely populated area of Montenegro, the central region has fewer tourist attractions. Notable are:
 Ostrog monastery, an Orthodox pilgrimage site
 Archeological remains of Duklja (Doclea) from Roman times outside Podgorica
 Cetinje the old royal capital of Montenegro
 Mount Lovćen, the national park and Petar II Petrović-Njegoš's Mausoleum have views of the surrounding area

 The Cetinje Monastery located in the old royal capital of Cetinje and the seat of the Metropolitanate of Montenegro
 The Morača Canyon
 The Morača Monastery overlooking the Morača Canyon
 Podgorica the country's capital

Beaches
The length of coastline of Montenegro is 293 km. It has 73 km of beaches, there are over 120 such beaches. There are varying beach styles from sand to pebbles of differing lengths.

Ulcinj

The coast line of Ulcinj is 32 km long. It has more than 10 beaches. Ada Bojana is a river island. It is a triangle shape with sea from one side. The beach is sandy and long. Velika Plaza is the longest beach in Montenegro and is one of the warmest beaches on the Adriatic Sea. It is 12 km long and it is covered with sand. It is very shallow. Small city beach is as same as Velika Plaza but it is not so long. Valdanos is little cove with pebbly beach and flora around it.

Bar

Bar Riviera is 44 km long and has got 9 km of beaches. There are more than 20 beaches but Bar has got 2 beaches on the lakeside. The main beach in Bar is Sutomore beach. It's 1 km long and is covered with sand. Canj beach is 1 km long and is a tourist location. The beach is covered with fine sand but the sea bottom is covered with round rocky pebbles. Queen's beach is very near Canj but it can be only approached from sea. Red beach is specific because it is covered with red round pebbles and the view from it is outstanding. Zukotrlica beach is over 1 km long and it is near the city. It is covered with white pebbles and in the background is a little pine forest. Beach Utjeha is also called "Olive Bay"  because there are hundreds of olives in the background. It is covered with pebbles and is very clear. On the lake there are two beaches: Pjesacac and Murici. They are covered with pebbles.

Budva

Budva Riviera has over 25 beaches and they are favourite destination for tourists in Montenegro. The longest beach is Jaz. It's 2.5 km long and is sandy. Mogren beach has specific small pebbles. It consist two little beaches and they are connected with a tunnel. Slovenska beach is 1.5 km long and is covered with sand. There are lot of hotels, restaurants and parks in the background. The Becici beach is long and sandy. Milocer beach, Queen's beach and Sveti Stefan beach are the most exclusive beaches in Montenegro. Pterovac beach is quiet long and is covered with little red pebbles. Special attraction there are two little isles and little fortress near beach. Buljarica beach is covered with sand and is 2 km long.

Tivat

There are over 15 small beaches in Tivat. Opatovo is a 200 m long pebble beach. Little lighthouse divides beach in two parts. Beach Plavi Horizonti is perhaps the most famous in Tivat. It is 300 m long and covered with small white pebbles. There are two islands near Tivat: The Island of St. Marko and Island of Flowers. They have very nice and attractive beaches.

Kotor

This is the deepest part of Boka Kotorska so there are fewer beaches. There are about 10 small beaches. Morinj beach is a pebbly beach with views of the bay. Risan beach is a quiet, long and rocky beach. Orahovac is the favourite beach in Kotor. It is pebbly with old stone houses in the background. Trsteno is also a pebbly beach. It is 200 m long with clear water and natural background.

Herceg Novi

Herceg Novi Riviera is 25 km long and it has over 20 beaches. Igalo beach is 1.5 km long and sandy. Rose beach is rocky with very nice forest background. Zanjic beach is located in Herceg Novi. It is 300 m long and it is covered with white pebbles.

Statistics by year

Tourist arrivals and overnights by nationality
Most visitors arriving to Montenegro in who stayed in registered accommodation came from the following countries:

National parks
List of national parks of Montenegro

UNESCO World Heritage Sites
The country has two distinct World Heritage Sites and additional two shared with other countries.

See also
 Visa policy of Montenegro

Notes

External links
 
 
 Official Tourism Website of Montenegro

References

Tourism in Montenegro
Montenegro